Han Juk-hui (born 8 May 1941) is a South Korean athlete. She competed in the women's long jump at the 1964 Summer Olympics.

References

1941 births
Living people
Athletes (track and field) at the 1964 Summer Olympics
South Korean female long jumpers
Olympic athletes of South Korea
Place of birth missing (living people)